Summer House is an American reality television series which has been broadcast on Bravo since January 9, 2017.

The success of the show has resulted in a spin-off, Winter House.

Overview
Summer House follows a group of nine friends who share a summer house in Montauk.

Season 1 
The first season premiered on January 9, 2017. Kyle Cooke, Cristina Gibson, Lindsay Hubbard, Stephen McGee, Carl Radke, Jaclyn Shuman, Everett Weston, Ashley Wirkus, and Lauren Wirkus were introduced as cast members.

The tenth episode of the fifth season in Vanderpump Rules titled "Summer House Rules" served as a cross-over preview to Summer House. The transition of the two-hour episode featured Kristen Doute, Katie Maloney, Stassi Schroeder and Scheana heading to New York and visit the summer house alongside the cast. After the Vanderpump Rules cast departed New York, the second half featured primarily on the Summer House cast. The second half of the episode attracted a total of 842,000 viewers.

The house in the first season is located at 90 Napeague Harbor Road, in Amagansett on the western edge of Montauk. Filming took place in private spaces though in the area.

It was announced in April 2017 that the series had been renewed for a second season. However, the Town of East Hampton denied permission to shoot at the same house on the Montauk/Napeague line. The Town noted that the house could not be used for commercial purposes, violated town codes prohibiting four unrelated people from living in a house, and was not on the town rental registry as required in 2017.

Season 2 
The second season premiered on January 22, 2018. Kyle Cooke, Lindsay Hubbard, Stephen McGee, Carl Radke, and Lauren Wirkus returned from the first season, with Amanda Batula, Amit Neuman, and Daniella Olivera joining the main cast. Ashley Wirkus returned in a recurring role.

The house in the second season is located at 1451 Deerfield Road, Watermill, New York (in Southampton, New York rather than East Hampton in the first season).

Season 3 
The third season premiered on March 4, 2019. Amanda Batula, Kyle Cooke, Lindsay Hubbard, Danielle Olivera, and Carl Radke returned for the third season, with Hannah Berner, Paige DeSorbo, and Jordan Verroi joining the main cast.

On June 11, 2019, it was reported that Danielle Olivera and Jordan Verroi would not return to the fourth season's main cast.

Season 4 
The fourth season premiered on February 5, 2020. Amanda Batula, Hannah Berner, Kyle Cooke, Paige DeSorbo, Lindsay Hubbard, and Carl Radke returned, with Jules Daoud and Luke Gulbranson joining the main cast.

Season 5 
Unlike previous seasons where filming took place over weekends throughout the summer, the format was changed for season five due to the ongoing COVID-19 pandemic. Rather than traveling back and forth between New York City and the Hamptons each weekend, the cast lived together and worked from home in the Hamptons for a full six weeks while filming occurred.

The fifth season premiered on February 4, 2021. Amanda Batula, Hannah Berner, Kyle Cooke, Paige DeSorbo, Luke Gulbranson, Lindsay Hubbard, Danielle Olivera, and Carl Radke returned, with Ciara Miller joining the cast.

A preview of Winter House season one appeared after the season finale on April 22, 2021.

Winter House Season 1 
In February 2021, it was reported that a spin-off of Summer House was in development.

The first season of Winter House premiered on October 20, 2021, and had a total of six episodes for its premiere season. Amanda Batula, Kyle Cooke, Paige DeSorbo, Luke Gulbranson, Lindsay Hubbard, and Ciara Miller join Craig Conover and Austen Kroll of Southern Charm for a trip to Stowe, Vermont.

A preview of Summer House season six appeared after the season finale on November 24, 2021.

In addition to the Summer House cast, Winter House has four new cast members; Andrea Denver, Julia McGuire, Gabrielle Kniery, and Jason Cameron.

Season 6 
The sixth season premiered on January 17, 2022. Amanda Batula, Kyle Cooke, Paige DeSorbo, Luke Gulbranson, Lindsay Hubbard, Ciara Miller, Danielle Olivera, and Carl Radke returned, with Andrea Denver of Winter House, Mya Allen, and Alex Wach. Hannah Berner did not return. Southern Charm’s Craig Conover and Austen Kroll also make guest appearances.

Winter House Season 2 
On June 28, 2022, Luke Gulbranson confirmed he had been fired from the series following the production of season two. Andrea Denver and Alex Wach were also confirmed not to be returning for the seventh season of Summer House.

Season 7 
The seventh season premiered on February 13, 2023.  Kyle Cooke, Lindsay Hubbard, Carl Radke, Amanda Batula, Danielle Olivera, Paige DeSorbo, Ciara Miller, and Mya Allen all returned, joined by Samantha Feher, Chris Leoni, and Gabby Prescod. Andrea Denver returned in a friend capacity, joined by Winter House cast member Kory Keefer. Luke Gulbranson and Alex Wach did not return in any capacity. Southern Charm's Craig Conover made guest appearances.

Cast

Timeline of Summer House cast

Timeline of Winter House cast

Episodes

Season 1 (2017)
Kyle Cooke, Cristina Gibson, Lindsay Hubbard, Stephen McGee, Carl Radke, Jaclyn Shuman, Everett Weston, Ashley Wirkus, and Lauren Wirkus are introduced as cast members.

Season 2 (2018)
Amanda Batula, Amit Neuman and Daniella Olivera join the main cast.

Season 3 (2019)
Hannah Berner, Paige DeSorbo and Jordan Verroi join the main cast.

Season 4 (2020)
Jules Daoud and Luke Gulbranson join the main cast.

Season 5 (2021)
Ciara Miller joins the main cast.

Season 6 (2022)
Andrea Denver, Mya Allen and Alex Wach join the cast.

Season 7 (2023)
Samantha Feher, Gabby Prescod and Chris Leoni join the main cast.

References

External links 
 
 

2010s American reality television series
2017 American television series debuts
2020s American reality television series
Bravo (American TV network) original programming
Television series by Endemol
English-language television shows
Television shows set in Long Island